Nelder can refer to:

Geoff Nelder, a British author
John Nelder (1924-2010), a British statistician
Nelder, a giant sequoia in California
Nelder Grove, a giant sequoia grove in California
Nelder–Mead method, a method to find the minimum or maximum of an objective function in a multidimensional space